Preferential looking is an experimental method in developmental psychology used to gain insight into the young mind/brain.  The method as used today was developed by the developmental psychologist Robert L. Fantz in the 1960s.

The Preferential Looking Technique
According to the American Psychological Association, the preferential looking technique is "an experimental method for assessing the perceptual capabilities of nonverbal individuals (e.g., human infants, nonhuman animals)". If the average infant looks longer at the second stimulus, this suggests that the infant can discriminate between the stimuli. This method has been used extensively in cognitive science and developmental psychology to assess the character of infant's perceptual systems, and, by extension, innate cognitive faculties. An investigator or examiner observes the infants behavior to determine which stimulus the infant fixates on.

Robert L. Fantz

Robert L. Fantz (1925-1981) was a developmental psychologist who launched several studies on infant perception including the preferential looking paradigm. Fantz introduced this paradigm in 1961 while working at the Case Western Reserve University. The preferential looking paradigm is used in studies of infants regarding cognitive development and categorization. Fantz's study showed that infants looked at patterned images longer than uniform images. He later built upon his study in 1964 to include habituation situations. These situations exhibited an infants preference for new or unusual stimuli.

Summary of Findings
Conclusions have been drawn from preferential looking experiments about the knowledge that infants possess. For example, if infants discriminate between rule-following and rule-violating stimuli—say, by looking longer, on average, at the latter than the former—then it has sometimes been concluded that infants know the rule.

Here is an example: 100 infants are shown an object that appears to teleport, violating the rule that objects move in continuous paths. Another 100 similar infants are shown an object that behaves in a nearly identical manner to the object from group 1, except that this object does not teleport. If the former stimulus induces longer looking times than the latter, then, so the argument goes, infants expect that objects obey the continuity rule, and are surprised when they violate this rule.

Findings from preferential looking experiments have suggested that humans innately possess sets of beliefs about how objects interact ("folk physics" or "folk mechanics") and about how animate beings interact ("folk psychology").

The Preferential Looking Technique at Work
A 2018 study collected data using a preferential looking paradigm. The paradigm was analyzing looking behavior and pupil dilation to track children's recognition to different degrees of  mismatching labels and objects in a picture. It was found evidence that there is a sensitivity to phonological mismatch among children. The study also provided support for the thesis that early comprehension and knowledge of root words are solid enough to convert subphonemic detail to what they are not familiar with.

Preferential looking experiments have been cited in support of hypotheses regarding a wide range of inborn cognitive capacities, including:
 Depth perception
 Face perception
 Basic arithmetic (numeracy)

Labs using preferential looking

 UIUC
 CWRU (Fantz, later Fagan et al.)

Studies employing preferential looking

See also
 Cognitive science
 Habituation

References

 Sheehy, Noel; Chapman, Antony J.; Conroy, Wendy A. (2002). Biographical Dictionary of Psychology. Retrieved 2019-06-28.
 Spelke, E.S. (1994). Initial knowledge: Six suggestions. Cognition, 50, pp. 431–445. (Reprinted in J. Mehler and S. Franck (Eds.) Cognition on Cognition, pp. 433–48. Cambridge, MA: MIT Press.)

Cognitive science
Behavioral concepts
Psychological methodology